Anders Skarholt is a Norwegian orienteering competitor and Junior World Orienteering Champion.

Junior career
Anders Skarholt competed at the 2006 Junior World Orienteering Championships in Druskininkai, where he received a gold medal in the long distance.

He participated on the Norwegian team in the relay event, together with Erik Sagvolden and Olav Lundanes, and received a bronze medal. Skarholt was running the first leg and developed a heart flutter, and finished his leg two and a half minutes behind the lead.

References

External links
 
 

1986 births
Living people
People from Asker
Norwegian orienteers
Male orienteers
Foot orienteers
Sportspeople from Viken (county)
20th-century Norwegian people
21st-century Norwegian people
Junior World Orienteering Championships medalists